Gim Myeong-won (1534–21 January 1603), also known as Kim Myeong-won, was a high official of the Joseon Dynasty, who served King Seonjo during the Seven Year War.  Born to a yangban family of the Gyeongju Gim lineage, he was the son of another high-ranking official, Gim Man-gyun.  He passed the civil service examination with the highest score in 1561, and was made jwachamchan, a post of the second junior rank under the State Council.  He gained prominence in 1589 when he exposed the treachery of provincial official Jeong Yeo-rip, who was plotting to attack the capital.    At this time, he received the title of "Prince Gyeongnim" (경림군).

Upon the outbreak of war in 1592, Gim took up military duty, leading the Joseon army to consecutive defeats at the capital and again at the Imjin River.  However, he remained vital to the royal family, as he led the army which guarded their retreat to Sunan in the far north following the surrender of Pyongyang.  
After the first wave of the war was over, KGim retired from his post as general due to illness.   He subsequently served in four ministerial posts in turn, those of Punishments, Rites, Public Works, and Military Affairs. Gim led the Joseon armies once again after the Japanese re-invasion of 1597.  He was made Supreme Councillor (uuijeong, 우의정) of the State Council in that year.  

After his death, Gim was given the posthumous title of Chungik-gong (忠翼公), "Loyal-winged general."

Notes

References

See also
List of Joseon Dynasty people
Joseon Dynasty politics
Hideyoshi's invasions of Korea

1534 births
1603 deaths
Gim clan of Gyeongju
People of the Japanese invasions of Korea (1592–1598)
16th-century Korean people